The Breaks is an American drama television series created by Dan Charnas and Seith Mann, serving as a continuation of the 2016 television film The Breaks. The series stars Afton Williamson, Wood Harris, Tristan Wilds, Antoine Harris, David Call, Evan Handler, and Melonie Diaz. The series premiered on VH1 on February 20, 2017. In April 2017, the series was renewed for a second season that would have aired on BET, but BET announced that it had canceled the series renewal in late November.

Cast
 Afton Williamson as Nikki
 Wood Harris as Barry Fouray
 Tristan Wilds as DeeVee
 Antoine Harris as Ahm
 David Call as David
 Evan Handler as Juggy
 Melonie Diaz as Damita
 Marcus Callender as Scooby
 De'Adre Aziza as Tamika Grant
 Method Man as Darryl Van Putten Sr.
 Gloria Reuben as Mattie Taylor
A-F-R-O as D-Rome
 Aaron J. Nelson as Bruce
 Sinqua Walls as Terrance "Lil' Ray" Baltimore
 Ali Ahn as Josie Cho
 Teyana Taylor as Imani X
 Kim Wayans as Ella
 Lela Rochon as Marie Jones
 Dave East as Hashim
 Hassan Johnson as Det. Anthony Purdell
 William Jackson Harper as Stephen Jenkins
 Russell Hornsby as Sampson King
 Macc H. Plaise as Jacques Fouray
 J. Bernard Calloway as Gordie Charlon
 Corey Allen as Benson
 Kandé Amadou as Tina
 Reginald L. Barnes as DJ X
 Philip Martin Reid as Scooter
 Omar Salmon as Brotha
 Jamar Greene as George Wilkinson
 Annalaina Marks as Rachel Greenbaum
 Michael McFadden as Eddie O'Laughlin

Episodes

References

External links
 

2017 American television series debuts
2017 American television series endings
2010s American drama television series
English-language television shows
VH1 original programming